The International Baccalaureate (IB), formerly known as the International Baccalaureate Organization (IBO), is a nonprofit foundation headquartered in Geneva, Switzerland, and founded in 1968.  It offers four educational programmes: the IB Diploma Programme and the IB Career-related Programme for students aged 15 to 19, the IB Middle Years Programme for students aged 11 to 16, and the IB Primary Years Programme for children aged 3 to 12. To teach these programmes, schools must be authorized by the International Baccalaureate.

The organization's name and logo were changed in 2007 to reflect new structural arrangements. Consequently, "IB" may now refer to the organization itself, any of the four programmes, or the diploma or certificates awarded at the end of a programme.

History

Inception
When Marie-Thérèse Maurette wrote "Educational Techniques for Peace. Do They Exist?" in 1948, she created the framework for what would eventually become the IB Diploma Programme (IBDP). In the mid-1960s, a group of teachers from the International School of Geneva (Ecolint) created the International Schools Examinations Syndicate (ISES), which would later become the International Baccalaureate Office (IBO), followed by the International Baccalaureate Organization (IBO) and then the International Baccalaureate (IB).

First programme
The IB headquarters were officially established in Geneva, Switzerland, in 1968 for the development and maintenance of the IB Diploma Programme. The objective of this programme was to "provide an internationally acceptable university admissions qualification suitable for the growing mobile population of young people whose parents were part of the world of diplomacy, international and multinational organizations" by offering standardized courses and assessments for students aged 16 to 19.

International Baccalaureate North America (IBNA) was established in 1975 by Peter Nehr, International Baccalaureate Africa, Europe and Middle-East (IBAEM) in 1986, and International Baccalaureate Asia Pacific (IBAP) during the same period. The International Baccalaureate now functions as a global organization with global centers in Geneva, Washington DC, The Hague, Cardiff and Singapore.

Other programmes
The IB Middle Years Programme (MYP) was first offered in 1994. Within five years, 51 countries had MYP schools. A revised MYP programme, referred to as the IB Middle Years Programme New chapter was introduced in September 2014.

The IB Primary Years Programme (PYP) was piloted in 1996 in 30 primary schools on different continents, and the first PYP school was authorized in 1997, with 87 authorized schools in 43 countries within five years.

The IB Career-related Programme (formerly IB Career-related Certificate) was first offered in 2012.

Directors General
Alec Peterson was IB's first director general (1968–1977), followed by Gérard Renaud (1977–1983), Roger Peel (1983–1998), Derek Blackman (1998–1999), George Walker (1999–2005), Jeffrey Beard (2006–2013) and Dr. Siva Kumari (2013-2021).

As of May 2021, Olli-Pekka Heinonen, Finnish politician and director of the Finnish National Agency of Education was selected by the board of directors to serve as director general, replacing Dr. Siva Kumari.

Organization 
The IB is a nonprofit organization, selling its products and services to schools in a system analogous to a franchise network. Schools buy products and services from the IB - assessments, publications, the right to use branding - and in turn schools act as distributors, reselling the products and services to families.

The IB maintains its head office in Geneva, Switzerland. Assessment and grading services are located in Cardiff, Wales and the curriculum centre moved in 2011 to The Hague, Netherlands. Two other offices are located in Washington D.C. and Singapore.

The organization is divided into three regional centres: IB Africa, Europe and Middle East (IBAEM), administered from The Hague; IB Americas (IBA), administered from Washington D.C.; and IB Asia-Pacific (IBAP), administered from Singapore.

Sub-regional associations "are groups formed by and for IB school practitioners to assist IB schools, teachers and students in their communities—from implementing IB programmes to providing a forum for dialogue." There are currently fifty-six (56) sub-regional associations, including:
 fifteen in the IB Africa, Europe and Middle East (IBAEM) region;
 thirty-six in the IB Americas (IBA) region; and
 five in the IB Asia Pacific (IBAP) region.

In 2003, the IB established the IB Fund, incorporated in the United States, for the purpose of enhancing fundraising and keeping funds raised separate from operational funds. In 2004, the IB approved a strategic plan to "ensure that programmes and services are of the highest quality" and "to provide access to people who are socio-economically disadvantaged." In 2010 and 2015 the strategic plans were updated after substantial consultation. The vision for the next five years was to more consciously establish the IB as a leader in international education and the Board outlined a vision and four strategic goals with key strategic objectives.

Access remains fundamental to the mission of the IB and a variety of initiatives and projects are helping to take it forward in Ecuador, Poland, Romania, the Czech Republic, South Africa, Kazakhstan, Spain, Philippines, Malaysia, Japan, and South Korea.

The United States has the largest number of IB programmes (2,010 out of 5,586) offered in both private and public schools.

The IB works with governments and nongovernmental organizations across the world and has consultative status as a nongovernmental organization (NGO) at United Nations Educational, Scientific and Cultural Organization (UNESCO) and has collaborative relationships with the Council of Europe and the Organisation Internationale de la Francophonie (OIF).

Governance 
The IB governance is composed of an IB Board of Governors and six committees (access and advancement, audit, education, finance, human resources and governance). The Board of Governors appoints the Director General, sets the strategic direction of the organization, adopts a mission statement, makes policy, oversees the IB's financial management, and ensures autonomy and integrity of the IB Diploma Programme examinations and other student assessment. The structure of its different committees are based on respect, representation and collaboration.

The Board of Governors can comprise between 15 and 25 members. Members are elected by the Board on the recommendation of the governance committee, and from nominations presented from the Heads Council, Regional Councils and the Board. To encourage diversity of gender, culture and geography, there are only three ex officio positions: Director General (non-voting), the chair of the Examining Board and the chair of the Heads Council.

Advisory bodies include the Heads Council and Regional Councils.

Reception

The IB Diploma Programme was described as "a rigorous, off-the-shelf curriculum recognized by universities around the world" when it was featured in the December 18, 2006, edition of Time titled "How to bring our schools out of the 20th Century". The IBDP was also featured in the summer 2002 edition of American Educator, where Robert Rothman described it as "a good example of an effective, instructionally sound, exam-based system."

In the US, in 2006, as part of the American Competitiveness Initiative (ACI), President George W. Bush and Education Secretary Margaret Spellings presented a plan for the expansion of Advanced Placement (AP) and International Baccalaureate mathematics and science courses, with the goal of increasing the number of AP and IB teachers and the number of students taking AP and IB examinations, as well as tripling the number of students passing those exams. Howard Gardner, a professor of educational psychology at Harvard University, said that the IBDP curriculum is "less parochial than most American efforts" and helps students "think critically, synthesize knowledge, reflect on their own thought processes and get their feet wet in interdisciplinary thinking."

In 2006, government ministers in the United Kingdom provided funding so that "every local authority in England could have at least one centre offering sixth-formers the chance to do the IB." In 2008, due to the devaluing of the A-Levels and an increase in the number of students taking the IB exams, then-Children's Secretary Ed Balls abandoned a "flagship Tony Blair pledge to allow children in all areas to study IB." Fears of a "two-tier" education system further dividing education between the rich and the poor emerged as the growth in IB is driven by private schools and sixth-form colleges. While the number of Diploma Programme state schools has dropped under budget constraints, the new Career-related Programme has seen solid uptake in the UK with 27 schools in Kent alone.

In 2006, an attempt was made to eliminate it from a public school in Pittsburgh, PA. Some schools in the United States have eliminated the IBDP due to budgetary reasons and low student participation. In Utah in 2008, funding for the IBDP was reduced from $300,000 to $100,000 after State Senator Margaret Dayton objected to the IB curriculum, stating, "First, I have never espoused eliminating IB ... I don't want to create 'world citizens' nearly as much as I want to help cultivate American citizens who function well in the world." Mayor Rahm Emanuel of Chicago, meanwhile, believes that IB should be an option for students in Chicago Public Schools. Elizabeth Brackett, reporting on her own experience of studying the IB in Chicago, found that it made for a stressful school experience but subsequently eased the pressures of university study. A further report by the University of Chicago concluded that Chicago Public School students who completed the IB curriculum were 40% more likely to attend a four-year college, 50% more likely to attend a selective four-year college, and significantly more likely to persist in college than their matched peers outside the IB. The City of Miami Beach Commission entered into an education compact with Miami-Dade County Public Schools with one of the initiatives of the compact to implement the IB curriculum throughout Miami Beach feeder schools.

In some other parts of the world, the International Baccalaureate has been well received. In 2013, the Ministry of Education, Culture, Sports, Science and Technology of Japan and the IB announced a plan that will expand the opportunities for Japanese students to complete the IB curriculum in Japanese.  In Malaysia a project has been developed in response to interest expressed by the Malaysia Ministry of Education (MoE) in working with the IB to implement the IB Middle Years Programme (MYP) in select secondary state schools.
The Abu Dhabi Education Council (ADEC) signed an agreement with the IB in efforts to widen the options offered for parents and to meet the different needs of students in the United Arab Emirates (UAE). In April 2014 The King Faisal Foundation in Saudi Arabia and the IB signed a memorandum of understanding to develop IB programmes, including the IBDP, in up to forty primary and secondary schools, with the goal of developing these schools as centres of excellence as IB World Schools.  In Peru President Ollanta Humala has committed to building a high performing schools network (COAR) made up of IB World Schools. In early 2016 thirteen new schools were authorized by the IB as part of this programme. In Ecuador, President Rafael Correa has also committed to improving education in state schools by implementing IB programmes and by January 2016 there were over 200 state schools. With support from local organizations, there are thirteen state IB schools in Russia. In Spain, various models have been implemented (3 types of schools in Spain: public schools, private schools and state funded-private or ‘concerted’ schools) and led to extensive growth with 140 schools.

Internationally the IB continues to be recognized as innovative, and in 2014 the World Innovation Summit for Education (WISE) announced the IB Career-related Certificate as a finalist for their annual WISE Awards. However, the IB came under heavy criticism around the world in 2020 for controversial estimated grades, set when COVID-19 precautions obstructed examinations.

According to tertiary educational agency 7Acad, the diploma mean grade stands at a 4 year low of 4.54 points, total points at a 5 year low of 28.51 pts as of 2019.

A study published by the University of Cambridge showed that a Cambridge student, who had obtained a score of 41 or more, achieved above-average success while at Cambridge. Students who had received 38 or less, were receiving grades below the average of all Cambridge students. Those that had the IB score of 38 or 39, obtained above average grades in science, and below average grades in social studies and humanities.

Controversy

May 2020 examination results

In March 2020, the IB announced that exams for the May 2020 session had been canceled as a response to the COVID-19 pandemic. It claimed that the final grades would instead be calculated based on course work, students' teacher-predicted grades, and historic school data. "Prior to the attribution of final grades, this process was subjected to rigorous testing by educational statistical specialists to ensure our methods were robust. It was also checked against the last five years’ sets of results data," an IB spokesman said. In July 2020, the IB released its results for Diploma Programme and Career-related Programme candidates enrolled in the May 2020 session. Over 17,000 signatories signed an online petition calling for a clarification of the grading methodology, and for free remarking and retesting. Several educators have criticized IB's approach to the 2020 grading. The Office of Qualifications and Examinations Regulation stated it would "scrutinize" the grades. The Norwegian Data Protection Authority asked the IB to provide data under the General Data Protection Regulation.

Some argued that using a school's historical data to produce grades was unfair to black or low-income students, or students from smaller schools. Others complained about the lack of transparency and fair process of the grades' appeal process.

May 2021 examination session 
In August 2020, amidst the continuing coronavirus pandemic, the IB announced a series of comprehensive amendments to its scheduled examinations in May 2021. They were inclusive of a few assessment components being discounted (for select subjects), and others being revised in length or syllabi. On 4 February 2021, the IB announced a dual exam route for the May 2021 examination: examinations were expected to take place in regions where a written assessment could be "administered safely", while candidates in other regions follow a non-exam "alternative route" based on coursework and predicted grades. This decision was met with stiff backlash as students taking the IB Diploma Programme protested against perceived injustice. Students argued that exams will have a negative impact on student mental health and wellbeing as well as possible consequences for university admissions. The IB's dual system approach has also been criticised as exam boards such as Cambridge, who cancelled their IGCSE and international A-levels exams.

See also 
 Cambridge International Examinations
 European Baccalaureate
 List of International Baccalaureate people
 List of International Baccalaureate schools by country

References

External links
 
 
 

 
01
Associations of schools
High school course levels
School qualifications
Organizations established in 1968